The Vale of Berkeley College was a small school located in Wanswell Berkeley, Gloucestershire, England.  The school closed in July 2011.

External links 
 Details (Archived 15 February 2012)

Defunct schools in Gloucestershire
Educational institutions established in 1971
1971 establishments in England
Educational institutions disestablished in 2011
2011 disestablishments in England
Berkeley, Gloucestershire